Founding may refer to:

 The formation of a corporation, government, or other organization
 The laying of a building's Foundation
 The casting of materials in a mold

See also 
 Foundation (disambiguation)
 Incorporation (disambiguation)